The 2019–20 season was Oud-Heverlee Leuven's 18th competitive season in professional football and the team's fourth consecutive season at the second level following their relegation from the Belgian Pro League in 2016. By clinching the first half of the season title in November 2019, Oud-Heverlee Leuven qualified for the promotion play-offs to play for the overall title and promotion, in which they faced Beerschot, who won the second half of the season.

After the first leg of the promotion final was played, which the club lost 1–0, the second leg at home was postponed due to the COVID-19 pandemic. Mid-May, the Belgian association of professional football clubs decided that the second leg should take place behind closed doors in the first weekend of August to determine the champion and promoting team, on 2 August 2020. Eventually however, on 31 July 2020, just two days before the actual final match, the decision was overturned and instead the 2020–21 Belgian First Division A would be expanded to 18 (from 16) teams, meaning both OH Leuven and Beerschot would be promoted. While both clubs had already clinched promotion because of this, the second leg of the promotional final was still played (behind closed doors), with Beerschot winning again and taking the overall title.

2019–20 squad
This section lists players who were in Oud-Heveree Leuven's first team squad at any point during the 2019–20 season
The symbol ℒ indicates a player who is on loan from another club
The symbol ¥ indicates a youngster who has appeared on the match sheet at least once during the season (possibly as unused substitute)

Transfers

May 2019 saw the first official transfer news published as midfielder Aboubakar Keita, who was already on loan from Copenhagen since the winter 2018–19 transfer window, was now signed permanently until 2022. Meanwhile experienced midfielder Koen Persoons was announced as new signing by Belgian Second Amateur Division club Knokke. The first new player incoming was 29 year old French midfielder Xavier Mercier, who came over from Cercle Brugge where he had previously worked under the duo of Franky Vercauteren and Vincent Euvrard when they won the 2017–18 Belgian First Division B title and were promoted. That season Mercier also won the Belgian First Division B MVP award. Still before summer, OH Leuven also departed from Jovan Kostovski whose contract had ended after six seasons with the club, allowing him a free agent move to Cypriot team Ethnikos Achna.

With the season at an end, several players returned from loan deals: young strikers Jo Gilis and Daan Vekemans returned from Eendracht Aalst with which they had not been able to avoid relegation from the 2018–19 Belgian First Amateur Division. The duo would join the reserve squad for 2019–20. Dutch striker Sam Hendriks returned from Cambuur where he had been on good form until a serious knee injury saw him sidelined for the remainder of 2019. Winger Leo Njengo returned from a loan to Heist, but as he was end of contract he left the club, signing some weeks later for Visé. Also returning from loan deal was defender Jordy Gillekens who had been loaned to Fiorentina. Meanwhile his goalkeeping brother Nick Gillekens was released after his contract ended, which was also the case for French midfielder Julien Gorius and Senegalese striker Simon Diedhiou. On the outgoing front, with their loan deals ending both Ahmed Touba and Jellert van Landschoot returned to Club Brugge after the season, similarly both Polish international Bartosz Kapustka and Elliott Moore returned to Leicester City F.C. Under-23s and Academy. Kapustka had in fact already returned a few months earlier to recover in Leicester from an injury ending his season while Moore was sold by Leicester City to Oxford United after two seasons on loan to OH Leuven. Kamal Sowah however remained with the squad, as it became clear his loan deal had been extended with one further season. On the other hand, English striker George Hirst was signed by Leicester City on a permanent basis.

In July, the club signed midfielder Tom Van Hyfte from direct competitors Beerschot and with Darren Keet brought in a new goalkeeper to replace Gillekens. Although South-African, Keet already has some five seasons of experience with the Belgian league as he played for Kortrijk from 2011 to 2016. Meanwhile winger Joeri Dequevy moved to Belgian First Division team RWDM47. Mid August saw the return of former OH Leuven defender Pierre-Yves Ngawa who returned after playing in the Italian Serie B for two seasons, replacing Dimitri Daeseleire who left for Rupel Boom. With transfer deadline day approaching, several players who were deemed surplus found a solution by moving to a different team: Jarno Libert to RWDM47, Jenthe Mertens to Go Ahead Eagles and Redouane Kerrouche to Aves. Meanwhile Burkinabé international Dylan Ouédraogo was brought in from Apollon Limassol as a backup defender. Finally, two last minute incoming transfers occurred with Slovenian winger/striker Milan Tučić being signed from Rudar Velenje and striker Jérémy Perbet arriving on loan from Charleroi.

During the 2019–20 winter transfer window, OH Leuven engaged in only few transfers. On the incoming side, midway through January, 21 year old Canadian Tristan Borges was brought in from Forge FC, while on transfer deadline day two more players came in from Gent: Jan Van den Bergh was loaned for 6-months (without buy clause) while Stallone Limbombe was signed until 2022. A few days after the transfer window had closed, former OHL player Yohan Croizet was signed as a free agent player, returning to the club after an earlier spell from 2014 to 2016. On the outgoing side, two players were sent out on loan: striker Sam Hendriks moved until the end of the season to Cambuur, where he had already been on loan the previous season; while Kawin Thamsatchanan was loaned out until the end of 2020 to Japanese team Hokkaido Consadole Sapporo.

Transfers In

Transfers Out

Belgian First Division B

OHL's season in the Belgian First Division B began on 4 August 2018.

Results

Belgian Cup

Results

Squad statistics
Includes only competitive matches.

Appearances
Players with no appearances not included in the list.

Goalscorers

Clean sheets

Footnotes

References

External links
 

2019-20
Belgian football clubs 2019–20 season
Oud-Heverlee Leuven seasons